Lake Aibugir is a lake in northern Daşoguz Province, Turkmenistan as part of the Amu Darya Plain. It is 77 km from the nearest district, Köneürgenç.

The lake was previously not an independent body of water as it was connected to the Aral Sea and referred to as the Aibugir Bay, however due to desertification in the 20th century, the two bodies of water no longer connect. The lake now consists of the western-most portion of the Aibugir Bay, of which the Turkmenistan border is established around.

References

Lakes of Turkmenistan